Cychrus hemphillii is a species of ground beetle in the subfamily of Carabinae. It was described by Horn in 1878.

References

hemphillii
Beetles described in 1878